The action of 14 April 1655 took place at Porto Farina (now Ghar el-Melh) in northern Tunisia, when an English fleet under Robert Blake destroyed the vessels of several Barbary corsairs. It achieved little direct effect, although it was the first time that ships alone defeated shore fortifications.

Action
Early in 1655, Blake sent a demand to the Bey of Tunis for the return of an English merchant ship and English prisoners, plus an indemnity and a future agreement but was refused. After sailing back and forth between Sardinia, Tunis, and Sicily for nearly two months and sending the demands again, he arrived on 13 April at Porto Farina, where the Barbary ships had gathered for their intended voyage to the Dardanelles to help the Turks that season. The next day, his first division attacked the Barbary ships, boarding and burning them by 8 am, while his second division of larger ships attacked the forts, silencing them by 11 am. This was the first time that ships alone had defeated shore fortifications. English casualties were 25 killed and 40 wounded. The Bey still refused his demands, but Blake's attack helped the Venetians in their battle against the Muslim states two months later at the action of 21 June 1655. The Ottomans would improve Porto Farina's fortifications over the next decade.

Order of battle

England (Robert Blake) 
First Division
Newcastle 40
Kentish 40
Taunton 36
Foresight 36
Amity 30
Princess Mary 34
Pearl 22
Mermaid 22
Merlin 24
Second Division
George 60
Andrew 54
Plymouth 50
Worcester 46
Unicorn 54
Bridgewater 50
Success 24

Barbary states 
9 ships hauled ashore (??) - Captured and burnt

Further reading
 

Conflicts in 1655
Naval battles involving England
1655
1655 in the Ottoman Empire